The East River of Pictou is a Canadian river located in Pictou County, Nova Scotia.

It rises at Hunters Lake in the community of Eden Lake. It discharges into Pictou Harbour which is a sub-basin of the Northumberland Strait.

The majority of the watershed is heavily forested.

The valley is tied to Nova Scotia's, and Canada's, earliest industrial activity since the discovery in 1798 of what is now known as the Pictou Coalfield in the Carboniferous Stellarton Basin.  Large-scale underground coal mining commenced along the river valley in 1827 under the General Mining Association and lasted until the explosion at the Westray Mine in 1992; small scale open pit mining has continued since 1992. The nation's first steel fabrication facility was founded in 1872 in Trenton, spurred in part by the availability of local coal and partly by the transportation opportunities provided by the navigable portion of the river and the arrival in 1867 of the Nova Scotia Railway.

Communities
(from source to mouth)

 Eden Lake
 Kerrowgare
 Sunny Brae
 Iron Rock
 Glencoe
 St. Pauls
 Bridgeville
 Springville
 Island East River
 Eureka
 Churchville
 Riverton
 Plymouth
 Stellarton
 New Glasgow
 Trenton
 Abercrombie
 Hillside
 Pictou Landing

See also
List of rivers of Nova Scotia

References

Rivers of Nova Scotia
Landforms of Pictou County